Frank Barlow is a fictional character from the British ITV soap opera Coronation Street, played by Frank Pemberton. As the head of the show's core Barlow family, Frank was one of the original twenty-one characters at the show's inception in 1960, along with wife Ida (Noel Dyson) and sons Ken (William Roache) and David (Alan Rothwell).

In his time on Coronation Street, Frank survived the death of Ida in 1961 and entered into a controversial relationship with younger woman Christine Appleby (Christine Hargreaves). He remained in a prominent role until May 1964, when the character was written out by series producer Tim Aspinall. Pemberton later reprised the role for two further episodes, in 1967 and 1971. Frank last appeared at the funeral of daughter-in-law Valerie Barlow (Anne Reid). Frank's son Ken later tells his son Peter (then played by Roache's own son Linus Roache) of his death in April 1975.

Pemberton never recovered from being made to leave a role he adored, and suffered a stroke in 1965. He found work increasingly hard to come by in the following years and suffered a fatal stroke in 1971, just a few weeks after his final appearance on the show.

Creation

Casting
Frank Pemberton was offered the role of Frank Barlow on the day of his audition, after he had heard Granada were prepared to pay £40 a week for a "middle-aged dad with a genuine Lancashire accent". He later described the day as "the most exciting" of his life.

Background
Postman Frank has been described as the archetypal "hard-working northern man", he dedicated his life to providing for his family. The family's working-class background meant Frank was resentful of Ken upon his return from university prior to the first episode, and their differences spilled out into the early episodes and continued throughout.

Frank Barlow was born in 1913 to parents Edna and Sidney Barlow. Frank joined the navy when he was 16 and he became very much a "man's man". His influences in life from that early age were men, and he depended on his superiors when his father Sidney died and Frank's mother Edna was taken ill soon after and spent time in a psychiatric unit, which prompted Frank to leave the Navy once his training was finished. A few years later Frank was introduced to Ida Leathers, a friend of his sister Marjorie, and the pair quickly fell for each other. Frank and Ida married on 1 May 1938, and went on to have two sons, Kenneth (b. 1939) and David (b. 1942).

Storylines
Frank Barlow was introduced as the pipe-smoking head of the Barlow family in the very first episode of the Street in 1960. Frank resented the way his son Ken (William Roache) thought himself superior to his family and their neighbours, and there was friction between the pair when Ken returned home from university. However, all their problems were put aside by the end of 1961 when they found themselves living alone. Second son David (Alan Rothwell) had left the Street in the summer to begin a new career as a footballer, and in September, Frank's wife Ida (Noel Dyson) had died under the wheels of a bus. Ida's untimely death was a shock for Frank, who took out his frustrations on Ken and told him he was nothing but a disappointment when he learned that Ken was out of work. They patched up their differences soon enough and learned to cope together.

In early 1963 Frank found love once again when his friendship with Christine Appleby (Christine Hargreaves), a widow, became something more. Their short-lived affair slipped into an engagement and shocked the neighbours, especially as Christine had been at school with Ken. Eventually the romance ended when the age difference became too much and Christine realised her feelings for him were not as strong as his for her.

Frank recovered from his disastrous relationship with Christine by quitting his job at the post office to open a DIY shop on Victoria Street. The new venture was a success but had to close due to fire damage later in the year. In 1964, Frank won £500 on the Premium Bonds and chose to leave the Street for a new life in Wilmslow. He sold the shop and celebrated his farewell in the Rovers Return Inn, on the same night Martha Longhurst (Lynne Carol) died. He left the street two weeks later without saying goodbye to Ken.

Frank made two further visits to the street; once in 1967, when Ken refused to pay a fine and instead went to prison, and then in 1971, when he arrived for the funeral of Ken's wife Valerie (Anne Reid).

Frank died at some point between 1971 and April 1975.

References

Coronation Street characters
Fictional British postal workers
Television characters introduced in 1960
Male characters in television